Juan de Bermúdez (died 1570) was a Spanish navigator of the 16th century.

Early life
Juan Bermúdez was born in Palos de la Frontera, Province of Huelva, Crown of Castile.

Voyages
In 1505, while sailing back to Spain from a provisioning voyage to Hispaniola in the ship La Garça (or Garza), he discovered Bermuda (historically rendered by various authors as la Bermuda (Peter Martyr d'Anghiera on his map of 1511), Barmvdas or Bermudas (Sylvester Jordain in A DISCOVERY OF THE BARMVDAS, OTHERWISE called the Ile of DIVELS, London, 1610), Bermoodos (John Jacob Berlu in The Treasury of Drugs Unlock'd, London, 1690), Bermoothes (William Shakespeare, borrowing the name for a fictional island in his 1611 play The Tempest), Bermudes (Henry Chatelain in the 1720 edition of his Atlas Historique, Bellin of Paris in his map of 1764, and various others)) which was later named after him. Legatio Babylonica, published in 1511 by Peter Martyr d'Anghiera, lists "La Bermuda" among the Atlantic islands. In 1515 he returned to Bermuda, landing a dozen pigs and sows for any unlucky mariners who might later be castaway there.

Bermúdez made 11 registered trips to the New World from 1495 to 1519.

References

15th-century births
1570 deaths
Year of birth unknown
Spanish explorers of North America
Spanish navigators
History of Bermuda
People from Palos de la Frontera